Lompico (from Loma and Pico, Spanish for "Hill" and "Peak") is a census-designated place (CDP) in Santa Cruz County, California. Lompico shares the 95018 ZIP code with Felton. Lompico was founded in 1927. It is in area code 831. The 2010 United States census reported Lompico's population was 1,137.

Geography
Lompico is proximate to Scotts Valley, California, Ben Lomond, California, and Felton, California, at latitude 37.106 and longitude -122.053.

According to the United States Census Bureau, the CDP covers an area of 3.4 square miles (8.7 km2), all of it land.

Climate
This region experiences warm (but not hot) and dry summers, with no average monthly temperatures above 71.6 °F.  According to the Köppen Climate Classification system, Lompico has a warm-summer Mediterranean climate, abbreviated "Csb" on climate maps.

Demographics
The 2010 United States Census reported that Lompico had a population of 1,137. The racial makeup of Lompico was 1,005 (88.4%) White, 6 (0.5%) African American, 12 (1.1%) Native American, 21 (1.8%) Asian, 4 (0.4%) Pacific Islander, 25 (2.2%) from other races, and 64 (5.6%) from two or more races. Hispanic or Latino of any race were 115 persons (10.1%).

The Census reported that 98.9% of the population lived in households and 1.1% lived in non-institutionalized group quarters.

There were 480 households, out of which 115 (24.0%) had children under the age of 18 living in them, 207 (43.1%) were opposite-sex married couples living together, 43 (9.0%) had a female householder with no husband present, 26 (5.4%) had a male householder with no wife present.  There were 41 (8.5%) unmarried opposite-sex partnerships, and 5 (1.0%) same-sex married couples or partnerships. 135 households (28.1%) were made up of individuals, and 14 (2.9%) had someone living alone who was 65 years of age or older. The average household size was 2.34.  There were 276 families (57.5% of all households); the average family size was 2.91.

The population was spread out, with 200 people (17.6%) under the age of 18, 93 people (8.2%) aged 18 to 24, 287 people (25.2%) aged 25 to 44, 485 people (42.7%) aged 45 to 64, and 72 people (6.3%) who were 65 years of age or older.  The median age was 44.2 years. For every 100 females, there were 106.4 males.  For every 100 females age 18 and over, there were 111.5 males.

The homeowner vacancy rate was 3.8%; the rental vacancy rate was 8.9%. 80.2% of the population lived in owner-occupied housing units and 18.7% lived in rental housing units.

Notable residents
Jerry Garcia's family had a country house in Lompico, which he visited while he was young.  He lost his middle finger due to a wood-chopping accident there.
Janis Joplin often jammed with her band "Big Brother and the Holding Company" in Lompico.

References

External links 
 Lompico.org

Census-designated places in Santa Cruz County, California
Populated places established in 1927
Census-designated places in California
1927 establishments in California